The 311th Military Intelligence Battalion is an active duty Military Intelligence (MI) Battalion of the United States Army stationed at Camp Zama, Japan and assigned to the 500th MI Brigade. The 311th MI Battalion is equipped to continue to provide support and train alongside U.S. Army Japan partner units, and Japan Ground Self-Defense Force coalition partners. The 311th conducts continuous multi-discipline Intelligence operations in support of U.S. Army Pacific operations and national level requirements in the U.S. Indo-Pacific area of operations.

Lineage 

 Constituted 1 June 1954 in the Regular Army as Headquarters and Headquarters Detachment, 311th Communication Reconnaissance Battalion
 Activated 14 June 1954 at Fort Devens, Massachusetts
 Reorganized and redesignated 16 May 1955 as Headquarters and Headquarters Company, 311th Communication Reconnaissance Battalion (336th Communication Reconnaissance Company [activated 6 August 1952] and 359th Communication Reconnaissance Company [activated 15 August 1944] concurrently reorganized and redesignated as Companies A and B)
 Redesignated 1 July 1956 as the 311th Army Security Agency Battalion
 Inactivated 18 December 1957 at Camp Wolters, Texas
 Headquarters and Headquarters Company activated 15 February 1966 at Fort Wolters, Texas (Companies A and B concurrently disbanded)
 Inactivated 30 June 1971 at Fort Hood, Texas
 (Companies A and B reconstituted 21 September 1978 in the Regular Army as the 336th and 359th Army Security Agency Companies - hereafter separate lineages)
 Headquarters and Headquarters Company, 311th Army Security Agency Battalion, reorganized and redesignated 1 June 1982 as Headquarters, Headquarters and Operations Company, 311th Military Intelligence Battalion, assigned to the 101st Airborne Division, and activated at Fort Campbell, Kentucky (265th Army Security Agency Company [see ANNEX 1] and 101st Military Intelligence Company [see ANNEX 2] concurrently reorganized and redesignated as Companies A and B)

Annex 1 
 Constituted 2 March 1967 in the Regular Army as the 265th Army Security Agency Company

 Activated 21 April 1967 at Fort Campbell, Kentucky

 Inactivated 1 April 1972 in Vietnam

 Activated 21 June 1976 at Fort Campbell, Kentucky

Annex 2 
 Constituted 12 July 1944 in the Army of the United States as the 101st Counter Intelligence Corps Detachment

 Activated 20 August 1944 in England with personnel from provisional Counter Intelligence Corps detachment attached to the 101st Airborne Division

 Inactivated 30 November 1945 in France

 Allotted 7 February 1956 to the Regular Army

 Activated 25 March 1956 at Fort Campbell, Kentucky

 Reorganized and redesignated 25 January 1958 as the 101st Military Intelligence Detachment

 Reorganized and redesignated 26 December 1969 as the 101st Military Intelligence Company

 Assigned 21 September 1978 to the 101st Airborne Division

Honors

Unit Awards

Company A additionally entitled to 
 Meritorious Unit Commendation (Army) for VIETNAM 1967-1968

 Meritorious Unit Commendation (Army) for VIETNAM 1969-1970

 Meritorious Unit Commendation (Army) for VIETNAM 1971-1972

 Republic of Vietnam Cross of Gallantry with Palm for VIETNAM 1968

 Republic of Vietnam Cross of Gallantry with Palm for VIETNAM 1968-1969

 Republic of Vietnam Cross of Gallantry with Palm for VIETNAM 1970-1971

 Republic of Vietnam Cross of Gallantry with Palm for VIETNAM 1971

 Republic of Vietnam Civil Action Honor Medal, First Class for VIETNAM 1968-1970

Company B additionally entitled to 
 Presidential Unit Citation (Army) for BASTOGNE

 French Croix de Guerre with Palm, World War II for NORMANDY

 Netherlands Orange Lanyard

 Belgian Croix de Guerre 1940 with Palm for BASTOGNE; cited in the Order of the Day of the Belgian Army for action at BASTOGNE

 Belgian Fourragere 1940

 Cited in the Order of the Day of the Belgian Army for action in FRANCE AND BELGIUM

 Republic of Vietnam Cross of Gallantry with Palm for VIETNAM 1968-1969

 Republic of Vietnam Cross of Gallantry with Palm for VIETNAM 1971

 Republic of Vietnam Civil Action Honor Medal, First Class for VIETNAM 1968-1970

Campaign Streamers

Southwest Asia 
 Defense of Saudi Arabia
 Liberation and Defense of Kuwait

Company A additionally entitled to

Vietnam 
 Counteroffensive, Phase III
 Tet Counteroffensive
 Counteroffensive, Phase IV
 Counteroffensive, Phase V
 Counteroffensive, Phase VI
 Tet 69/Counteroffensive
 Summer-Fall 1969
 Winter-Spring 1970
 Sanctuary Counteroffensive
 Counteroffensive, Phase VII
 Consolidation I
 Consolidation II
 Cease-Fire

Company B additionally entitled to

World War II 
 Normandy (with arrowhead)
 Rhineland (with arrowhead)
 Ardennes-Alsace; Central Europe

Vietnam 
 Counteroffensive, Phase III
 Tet Counteroffensive
 Counteroffensive, Phase IV
 Counteroffensive, Phase V
 Counteroffensive, Phase VI
 Tet 69/Counteroffensive
 Summer-Fall 1969
 Winter-Spring 1970
 Sanctuary Counteroffensive
 Counteroffensive, Phase VII
 Consolidation I
 Consolidation II

Heraldry

Coat of Arms

Blazon 
The shield is Azure, a cross quarter-pierced Argent and overall two lightning bolts in saltire Or between in each quarter as many fleurs-de-lis of the second; overall a dragon passant Gules.

Symbolism 
The checkered field in the colors used for Military Intelligence units, silver gray (white) and oriental blue, suggests the gathering of data to aid in the formulation of military strategy; the lightning bolts refer to the use of electronics in the gathering operation.  The dragon is a reference to service in Vietnam and its scarlet color alludes to the award of three Meritorious Unit Commendations to elements of the Battalion.  The fleurs-de-lis denote service in Europe during World War II.

Distinctive Unit Insignia

Blazon 
A Gold color metal and enamel device 1 1/8 inches (2.86 cm) in height overall consisting of a shield blazoned:  Azure, a cross quarter-pierced Argent and overall two lightning bolts in saltire Or between in each quarter as many fleurs-de-lis of the second; overall a dragon passant Gules.  Attached below and to the sides of the shield a Gold scroll inscribed "EYES OF THE EAGLE" in Black letters.

References 

Military Intelligence battalions of the United States Army